Timea Bacsinszky and Caroline Garcia were the defending champions, but decided not to participate.

Tímea Babos and Michaëlla Krajicek won the title, defeating Han Xinyun and Eri Hozumi in the final 6–2, 6–2.

Seeds

Draw

References 
 Draw

Suzhou Ladies Open - Doubles
Suzhou Ladies Open